KTIG is a Christian radio station licensed to Pequot Lakes, Minnesota, broadcasting on 102.7 MHz FM.  The station serves the areas of Brainerd, Minnesota and Staples, Minnesota, and is owned by Minnesota Christian Broadcasters, Inc.

Programming
KTIG's programming includes Christian talk and teaching shows such as Truth for Life with Alistair Begg, Turning Point with David Jeremiah, Insight For Living with Chuck Swindoll, Revive Our Hearts with Nancy DeMoss Wolgemuth, In Touch with Dr. Charles Stanley, Focus on the Family, and In the Market with Janet Parshall.  KTIG also airs a variety of Christian music.

History
KTIG began broadcasting on April 30, 1978, and originally broadcast on 100.1 MHz FM, running 3,000 watts. In 1990, KTIG increased power to 6,000 watts, and in 1994 the station changed frequencies to 102.7 FM and increased power to 40,000 watts.

Translators

References

External links

Christian radio stations in Minnesota
Moody Radio affiliate stations
Radio stations established in 1978
1978 establishments in Minnesota